Harri Heliövaara and Denys Molchanov were the defending champions but Heliövaara decided not to participate.
Molchanov played alongside Uladzimir Ignatik.
Andre Begemann and Martin Emmrich won the title by defeating Rameez Junaid and Frank Moser 6–7(2–7), 7–6(7–2), [10–8] in the final.

Seeds

Draw

Draw

References
 Main Draw

Tashkent Challenger - Doubles
2012 Doubles